Primary metaphor is a term named by Joseph Grady for the basic connection that exist between subjective or abstract experiences such as good and concrete experiences such as up. These two concepts usually correlate in experience, and form the primary metaphor good is up. Likewise there is a correlation between knowing and seeing forming the primary metaphor knowing is seeing. Two such primary metaphors are used when understanding an expression such as glass ceiling.

An example of a primary metaphor could be that of Shakespeare's 'As You Like It', where life is depicted as being similar to a theater. Therefore, 'LIFE' relates to a conceptual experience, and 'THEATER' represents a concrete experience. Thus forming the primary metaphor; LIFE IS THEATER.

See also

 Conceptual metaphor
 Cognitive linguistics
 George Lakoff

Metaphors by type